Kenneth Luster Hallenbeck (born October 20, 1931) is a former president of the American Numismatic Association. He has served with the ANA for 58 years. In recognition of his service and dedication to numismatics, he has received various honours from the ANA. He is the recipient of the Glenn Smedley Memorial Award, the Medal of Merit, the Exemplary Service Award, and the 1999 Farran Zerbe Memorial Award for distinguished service.

Career
He was first elected to the ANA Board of Governors in 1971 and served for six years. His next position with the ANA was in service to the Money Museum. From 1977 to 1983, he would be the curator. On two separate occasions, he was elected to the organization’s policy making board. Hallenbeck served as ANA President from 1989-91. His tenure on the Board of Governors came prior to the 10-year limitation currently in force; he has a total of 16 years of service on the Board.

Hallenbeck served on the U.S. Assay Commission in 1974.

In 1983, Hallenbeck opened his own coin shop called The Hallenbeck Coin Gallery in Colorado Springs. His son, Tom took over the enterprise in 2001. Ken and Tom Hallenbeck are the only father and son to serve as Board members of the ANA. Tom served from 1997 to 2001.

Hallenbeck was the Acting Executive Director of the American Numismatic Association from August 2007 until the hiring of Larry Sheppard in July 2008. He helped to stabilize and boost the morale of the Association's employees after the firing of Christopher Chipoletti.

Hallenbeck is considered to be an authority on counter-stamped coins, which are coins that have been stamped by an entity outside of the Mint, usually a business such as a doctor, pharmacist or silversmith. He has written articles on counter-stamped coins for The Numismatist, Coin World, Numismatic Scrapbook Magazine and others.

Personal life
Hallenbeck married June Eugenia Miekka in 1955, and they have four children, including Tom Hallenbeck, who is a coin dealer and recipient of the Chester L. Krause Memorial Distinguished Service Award.

Currently, he is a resident of Colorado Springs, Colorado.

References

1931 births
Living people
American numismatists
People from Colorado Springs, Colorado